Kenneth "Kenny" Bain (born 16 March 1990) is a Scottish field hockey player who plays as a forward for Dutch club Hurley and the Scottish national team.

He represented Scotland in the  2010 and 2014 Commonwealth Games. In August 2019, he was selected in the Scotland squad for the 2019 EuroHockey Championship.

Club career
Bain played for Kelburne in Scotland and hdm in the Netherlands before he moved to Hurley in 2011. In 2015 he joined Amsterdam. After the head coach Alyson Annan left in 2016 he moved to HGC. After one season with HGC he returned to Hurley.

References

External links

1990 births
Living people
Field hockey players from Glasgow
Male field hockey forwards
Scottish male field hockey players
Field hockey players at the 2010 Commonwealth Games
Field hockey players at the 2014 Commonwealth Games
Haagsche Delftsche Mixed players
Amsterdamsche Hockey & Bandy Club players
HGC players
Men's Hoofdklasse Hockey players
Commonwealth Games competitors for Scotland
Scotland men's international field hockey players